There are at least 41 named lakes and reservoirs in Crittenden County, Arkansas.

Lakes

 Beautiful Lake, el.  
 Benwood Lake, el.  
 Big Lake, el.  
 Blackfish Lake, el.  
 Blue Lake, el.  
 Brougham Lake, el.  
 Buck Lake, el.  
 Bushy Lake, el.  
 Cane Lake, el.  
 Copperas Lake, el.  
 Danner Lake, el.  
 Dead Timber Lake, el.  
 Fletcher Lake, el.  
 Goose Lake, el.  
 Grassy Lake, el.  
 Holden Lake, el.  
 Hood Lake, el.  
 Hopefield Chute, el.  
 Hopefield Lake, el.  
 Horseshoe Lake, el.  
 Island Forty Chute, el.  
 Lake David, el.  
 Lake Deloche, el.  
 Lewis Lake, el.  
 Little Grassy Lake, el.  
 Long Pond, el.  
 Marion Lake, el.  
 McCarter Lake, el.  
 Meneshea Lake, el.  
 Mound City Chute, el.  
 North Lake, el.  
 Old River Lake, el.  
 Porter Lake, el.  
 Shell Lake, el.  
 South Lake, el.  
 Stave Lake, el.  
 Stump Lake, el.  
 Swan Lake, el.  
 Wapanocca Lake, el.

Reservoirs
 Dead Timber Lake, el.  
 Luss Lake, el.

See also

 List of lakes in Arkansas

Notes

Bodies of water of Crittenden County, Arkansas
Crittenden